Underground is a 1997 album by the English saxophonist, Courtney Pine. It was released on the Verve label.  It features elements of hip-hop integrated with jazz.

Track listing
All tracks composed and arranged by Courtney Pine
"Intro – Inhale"
"Modern Day Jazz"
"Tryin' Times"
"Oneness of Mind"
"Invisible (Higher Vibe)"
"Book of ... (The Dead)"
"Children of the Sun"
"The In-Sense Song"
"Silver Surfer"
"Underground"
"Outro – Xhale"
"Save the Children"

Personnel
 Courtney Pine – Soprano & Tenor Saxophone, Bass Clarinet and Flutes
 Cyrus Chestnut – Acoustic Piano, Hammond B3 Organ and Wurlitzer Electric Piano
 Reginald Veal – Double Bass
 Jeff "Tain" Watts – Drums
 DJ Pogo –  Turntable 
 Jhelisa –  Vocals
 Nicholas Payton – Trumpet
 Mark Whitfield –  Guitar

References

1997 albums
Courtney Pine albums
Verve Records albums